Myron Joseph Cotta (born March 21, 1953) is an American prelate of the Roman Catholic Church. He was appointed as the sixth bishop of the Diocese of Stockton in California by Pope Francis on January 23, 2018. His installation mass was celebrated on March 15, 2018 at St. Stanislaus Catholic Church in Modesto, California.  Cotta previously served as an auxiliary bishop of the Diocese of Sacramento in California from 2014 to 2018.

Biography

Early life 
Myron Cotta was born on March 21, 1953, in Dos Palos, California and was educated in public and Catholic schools.  He received an associates degree from West Hills College Coalinga in Coalinga, California.He studied for the priesthood at St. John's Seminary in Camarillo, California.    He is fluent in English, Spanish and Portuguese.

Priesthood 
Cotta was ordained a priest by Bishop José de Jesús Madera Uribe for the Diocese of Fresno on September 12, 1987. After his ordination, Cotta served several pastoral assignments in California parishes:

 Parochial vicar at St. Anthony in Atwater from 1987 to 1989
 Administrator of Our Lady of Fatima Shrine in Laton from 1989 to 1992
 Pastor of Our Lady of Miracles Parish in Gustine from 1992 to 1999.  

Following his pastoral assignments, Cotta served as the vicar general and moderator of the curia for the diocese.  Pope John Paul II named Cotta a chaplain of his holiness, with the title of monsignor, in 2002.  Pope Benedict XVI named him a prelate of honor in 2009.

Auxiliary Bishop of Sacramento 

Pope Francis appointed Cotta to be an auxiliary bishop of the Diocese of Sacramento on January 24, 2014. He was also named titular bishop of Muteci.  He was consecrated in the Cathedral of the Blessed Sacrament in Sacramento on March 25, 2014 by Bishop Jaime Soto.  Bishop Armando Ochoa and Bishop José de Jesús Madera Uribe were the principal co-consecrators.

Bishop of Stockton
On January 23, 2018, Pope Francis named Cotta as bishop of the Diocese of Stockton.  He was installed on March 15, 2018. At his installation mass, attendees included Archbishop Salvatore Cordileone and Archbishop Christophe Pierre.

See also

 Catholic Church hierarchy
 Catholic Church in the United States
 Historical list of the Catholic bishops of the United States
 List of Catholic bishops of the United States
 Lists of patriarchs, archbishops, and bishops

References

External links
  Roman Catholic Diocese of Stockton Official Website

Episcopal succession

1953 births
Living people
People from Merced County, California
St. John's Seminary (California) alumni
21st-century Roman Catholic bishops in the United States
Roman Catholic Diocese of Sacramento
Roman Catholic bishops of Stockton
American people of Portuguese descent
Bishops appointed by Pope Francis